Brakstad is a surname. Notable people with the surname include:

 Oddrun Brakstad Orset (born 1979), Norwegian ski mountaineer
 Torkild Brakstad (1945–2021), Norwegian soccer player and coach

Norwegian-language surnames